The Dayton Literary Peace Prize is an annual United States literary award "recognizing the power of the written word to promote peace" that was first awarded in 2006. Awards are given for adult fiction and non-fiction books published at some point within the immediate past year that have led readers to a better understanding of other peoples, cultures, religions, and political views, with the winner in each category receiving a cash prize of $10,000. The award is an offshoot of the Dayton Peace Prize, which grew out of the 1995 peace accords ending the Bosnian War. In 2011, the former "Lifetime Achievement Award" was renamed the Richard C. Holbrooke Distinguished Achievement Award with a $10,000 honorarium.

In 2008, Martin Luther King Jr. biographer Taylor Branch joined Studs Terkel and Elie Wiesel as a recipient of the Dayton Literary Peace Prize's Lifetime Achievement Award, which was presented to him by special guest Edwin C. Moses. The 2008 ceremony was held in Dayton, Ohio, on September 28, 2008. Nick Clooney, who hosted the ceremony in 2007, again served as the evening's host in 2008 and 2009.

The 2009 ceremony was held in Dayton, Ohio, on November 8, 2009, at which married authors and journalists Nicholas Kristof and Sheryl WuDunn received the Dayton Literary Peace Prize's 2009 Lifetime Achievement Award.

Recipients

Fiction

Nonfiction

Lifetime Achievement Award

Richard C. Holbrooke Distinguished Achievement Award

References

External links
 Dayton Literary Peace Prize - An International Award

International literary awards
Awards established in 2006
Peace awards
American non-fiction literary awards
American fiction awards
Culture of Dayton, Ohio
2006 establishments in Ohio
English-language literary awards